The molecular formula C21H25N (molar mass: 291.43 g/mol, exact mass: 291.1987 u) may refer to:

 L-687,384
 Terbinafine
 Melitracen

Molecular formulas